Ekoli Mahenge Zulu (November 21, 1965 – August 27, 2019) was an African-born, Italian boxer. He competed in the welterweight category.

Biography
Mahenge Zulu was born in Kinshasa, Democratic Republic of the Congo. He grew up in Pesaro, in the region of Marche, in Italy.

He started boxing at the age of 15 and made his professional debut at 25, later than most boxers. In 1996 he won the IBF Intercontinental welterweight title. He retired after his loss against Félix Trinidad in a 1998 fight for the IBF welterweight title at the age of 33, ending his boxing career with a record of 17 wins, 3 losses and 1 draw.

He died of a heart attack on August 27, 2019 while on a flight to Zaire. He had suffered some heart and blood pressure issues days before and was warned by his doctor to not fly. Zulu was married to Emilia Bonse, who died in 2016. They have four daughters.

Professional Boxing Record

External links
https://boxrec.com/en/proboxer/7584

References

1965 births
2019 deaths
Democratic Republic of the Congo emigrants to Italy
Italian male boxers
Italian sportspeople of African descent
People from Pesaro
Sportspeople from Kinshasa
Sportspeople from the Province of Pesaro and Urbino
Welterweight boxers